Helge Perälä (3 June 1915, Vehkalahti – 13 February 2010) was a Finnish long-distance runner who competed in the 1948 Summer Olympics.

References

1915 births
2010 deaths
People from Hamina
People from Viipuri Province (Grand Duchy of Finland)
Finnish male long-distance runners
Olympic athletes of Finland
Athletes (track and field) at the 1948 Summer Olympics
European Athletics Championships medalists
Sportspeople from Kymenlaakso